Gaillardiella is a genus of fungi within the Bertiaceae family.
It has been found 3 times in Costa Rica in the early 2000s at elevations 50, 250, and 650 meters.

The genus name of Gaillardiella is in honour of Albert Gaillard (1858–1903), who was a French mycologist.

The genus was circumscribed by Narcisse Théophile Patouillard in Bull. Soc. Mycol. France Vol.11 on page 226 in 1895.

References

External links

Sordariomycetes genera
Coronophorales